Pehla Chakravyuh - CHALAVA (2022) is an Indian Mystery Drama Serial Killer web series created by Dushyant Kapoor and produced by Neelam Sagar, Naveen Singh, Dushyant Kapoor. It was released on YouTube, and now it is streaming on Disney+ Hotstar. The series premiered on 10 June 2022.

Premise 
A mysterious serial killer is being transferred from one prison to another; Ashish Dutta, a new police officer, is assigned to lead the journey, which leads to shocking events, deaths, and unimaginable crimes."

Cast 

 Rituraj Singh as Giriraj
 Aashay Srivastavaa as Aashish Dutta
 Sourav Gautam as Chalava
 Shashi Prakash Chopra as Murari
 Nakul Rawat as Chandan
 Mukul Monga as Amar Singh
 Nagesh Gola as Hemant
 Sanjay Srivastava as Constable Virendra
 Yuvraj Pratap Singh as Laxman
 Rakesh Singh Bhadauriya as Arvind
 Shailendra Pandey as Dr. Anand
 Rajat Singh as Lakhan
 Bhawna Batra as Neha Dutta

Reference links

External links 
Pehla Chakravyuh - Chalava on IMDb

Official Website

DK Films Website
2022 web series debuts
Indian web series